The M360 105mm Cartridge was a chemical artillery shell designed for use by the U.S. Army.

History
The U.S. Army standardized the M121 shell in 1954.

See also
M60 105mm Projectile

References

Chemical weapon delivery systems
Artillery shells
Chemical weapons of the United States
Military equipment introduced in the 1950s